Kieran Crichlow (born 31 July 1981) is a retired footballer who played as a striker. Born in England, he represented Barbados at international level.

Club career
He played for a number of English non-league clubs, including Hounslow Borough, Molesey, Witney United and Hampton & Richmond Borough.

International career
Crichlow made his debut for Barbados in a May 2008 friendly match against Trinidad & Tobago.

References

1981 births
Living people
English people of Barbadian descent
English footballers
Barbadian footballers
Barbados international footballers
Hounslow Borough F.C. players
Molesey F.C. players
Witney Town F.C. players
Hampton & Richmond Borough F.C. players
Association football forwards